Saukkonen is a Finnish surname.

Geographical distribution
As of 2014, 91.3% of all known bearers of the surname Saukkonen were residents of Finland, 3.9% of Russia, 1.9% of Sweden and 1.4% of Estonia.

In Finland, the frequency of the surname was higher than national average in the following regions:
 1. North Karelia (1:614)
 2. South Karelia (1:760)
 3. Southern Savonia (1:1,362)
 4. Northern Savonia (1:2,000)
 5. Northern Ostrobothnia (1:2,387)
 6. Uusimaa (1:2,969)

People
Notable people with the surname include:

Jussi Saukkonen, Finnish politician
Kari Saukkonen, Finnish professional darts player
Mika Saukkonen, Finnish ice hockey journalist
Tuomas Saukkonen, Finnish singer

References

Finnish-language surnames